Barndioota is a locality and former town in the southern Flinders Ranges west of Hawker. The bounded locality of Barndioota which corresponds to the cadastral Hundred of Barndioota, also includes the former town of Hookina and the site of the ceased Government Town of Barndioota which was surveyed in 1883 and declared ceased to exist in 1929.

The traditional owners of the area are the Adnyamathanha peoples.

Mount Eyre which is located in the northern part of the locality was "the northernmost point of Eyre's 1839 expedition and named by Governor Gawler on 11 July 1839."

In April 2016, Wallerberdina Station in Barndioota was proposed as a possible site for a government-owned nuclear waste storage facility.  The proposal met opposition from locals, Aboriginal people and environmental groups. A decision on this is not expected soon.

References

Far North (South Australia)